Boku Tabi is the debut studio album by Japanese pop-rock band Chicago Poodle. It was released on 11 November 2009 by Giza Studio label.

Background
After the five years of the indies activity they moved from indies label Tent House to major label Giza Studio owned by Being Inc. distributors. It makes their first album released by this label.

The album consists of three previously unreleased singles, such as Odyssey, Natsu Mellon and Sayonara Baby.

Two months before the album release, on September the tracks Bye Bye, Natsu Mellon and Oddysey (only 1 chorus) were included in Tsutaya limited rental album "Chicago Poodle Choi Kiki CD".

Charting
It reached #41 rank in Oricon for first week and sold 2,931 copies. It charted for 3 weeks and sold 4,861 copies.

Track listing
All the songs has been arranged by Chicago Poodle

In media
Hallelujah was used as ending theme for March of TV Kanazawa program "Tonari no TV Kinchan"
Tabi Bito was used as ending theme for TV Tokyo program "Golf no Shizui"
Oddysey was used as ending theme for TV Tokyo program "JAPAN COUNTDOWN"
Natsu Mellon was used as ending theme for July of Sanyo Broadcasting program "Yutanpo"
Sayonara Baby was used as ending theme for September of TV Kanazawa program "Tonari no TV Kinchan"

References 

Giza Studio albums
Being Inc. albums
Japanese-language albums
2009 debut albums
Chicago Poodle albums